Liam Cameron (born 21 October 1990) is an English former professional boxer who competed from 2009 to 2018. He held the Commonwealth middleweight title from 2017 to 2018 and challenged twice for the super-middleweight version between 2015 and 2016.

Professional career

Cameron made his professional debut on 24 October 2009, scoring a six-round points decision (PTS) victory over Matt Scriven at the City Hall in Sheffield.

After compiling a record of 9–0 (3 KOs) he suffered his first defeat at the hands of Erick Ochieng, losing via PTS (77–74) on 28 May 2011 at the Hillsborough Leisure Centre in Sheffield. He bounced back from defeat with three wins, one by knockout (KO), before suffering a second defeat on 23 June 2012, losing to Jez Wilson by PTS (97–95) for the vacant Central Area middleweight title at the Don Valley Stadium, Sheffield. After three more wins, one by technical knockout (TKO), he faced Rod Smith for the vacant International Masters middleweight title on 13 December 2013 at IceSheffield, losing by PTS (96–95) over ten rounds.

Following the third defeat of his career, he faced Wayne Reed on 10 May 2014 at the Octagon Centre in Sheffield. Cameron won his first professional title, defeating Reed via unanimous decision (UD) over ten rounds to capture the vacant IBO Youth super-middleweight title. One judge scored the bout 98–90 while the other two scored it 98–92.

After two more wins in non-title fights, including one stoppage by corner retirement (RTD), he faced Luke Blackledge for the vacant Commonwealth super-middleweight title on 4 April 2015 at the King George's Hall in Blackburn. Cameron lost by UD with the scorecards reading 117–112, 116–113 and 115–114. After a TKO win against Giorgi Beroshvili in October, Cameron was scheduled to face English super-middleweight champion, Jahmaine Smyle, on 29 May 2016. A week before the event, the bout was called off due to financial issues arising from low ticket sales. Following 13 months out of the ring due to the cancellation, he next fought on 25 November 2016 against Zac Dunn at The Flemington Pavilion in Melbourne, Australia. The fight would give Cameron a second attempt at the Commonwealth super-middleweight title after Blackledge vacated in favour of a British super-middleweight title fight. Cameron once again missed out on the title, losing via twelve-round UD with the scorecards reading 117–111, 116–112 and 115–113.

He moved down in weight for his next fight in a third attempt at a Commonwealth title, challenging Commonwealth middleweight champion, Sam Sheedy. Originally set to take place on 29 July, the bout was rescheduled to 13 October 2017, at the Ponds Forge Arena in Sheffield, after Sheedy suffered an injury during training. In an action-packed fight, Cameron scored three knockdowns with body shots in the fourth round, with Sheedy receiving a point deduction in the round for a head butt. Cameron scored another knockdown in the seventh, again from a body shot, with Sheedy also receiving a standing eight count after being on the receiving end of a barrage of punches from Cameron. The end came in the following round when the referee stepped in to call a halt to the contest to save Sheedy from further punishment, awarding Cameron the Commonwealth title via eighth-round TKO.

He was due to make the first defence of his title against Nicky Jenman on 24 April 2018 at IceSheffield, however, Jenman failed to make weight, prompting the Commonwealth Boxing Council (CBC) to withdraw its sanction for the fight. The bout went ahead regardless. Cameron knocked Jenman down in the second round. Jenman was able to make it back to his feet before the count of ten before referee Terry O'Connor waved the fight off, handing Cameron a second-round TKO victory.

Following his win over Jenman, it was announced in July that Cameron had failed a post-fight drug test and was subsequently suspended by the British Boxing Board of Control (BBBofC) pending further investigation. Following the suspension, the CBC stripped Cameron of their title as he was unable to defend it against a mandatory challenger due to the suspension. The UK Anti-Doping (UKAD) agency found Cameron guilty for the anti-doping violation and imposed a four-year ban. He appealed the decision in October 2019, but was unsuccessful. Cameron confirmed his retirement after the ban was upheld.

Professional boxing record

References

External links

Living people
1990 births
English male boxers
Sportspeople from Sheffield
Middleweight boxers
Super-middleweight boxers
Commonwealth Boxing Council champions